Tempel Synagogue may refer to:
 Tempel Synagogue (Kraków)
 Tempel Synagogue (Lviv)
 Tempel Synagogue (Przemyśl)